Sir John Tufton, 2nd Baronet (c. 1623 – 11 October 1685) was an English politician  who sat in the House of Commons from 1660  to 1685.

Tufton was the eldest surviving son of Sir Humfrey Tufton, 1st Baronet of The Mote, Maidstone, Kent and his wife Margaret Morley, daughter of Herbert Morley of Glynde, Sussex. He matriculated at University College, Oxford on 29 April 1636, aged 13. He was knighted on 21 December 1641. In October 1659 he succeeded to the baronetcy on the death of his father.

In April 1660, Tufton was elected Member of Parliament (MP) for Kent in the Convention Parliament. He was re-elected MP for Kent in 1661 for the Cavalier Parliament. He was elected MP for Maidstone in the two elections of 1679 and in 1681 and 1685.

Tufton married firstly Margaret, daughter of Thomas, 2nd Baron Wotton of Marley. He married secondly before 1657, Mary Altham, daughter of Sir James Altham of Markshall, Latton, Essex. He had no issue and the baronetcy became extinct on his death. Debts compelled the sale of his estate.

References

1620s births
1685 deaths
Baronets in the Baronetage of England
English MPs 1660
English MPs 1661–1679
English MPs 1679
English MPs 1680–1681
English MPs 1681
English MPs 1685–1687